Genocide is an original novel written by Paul Leonard and based on the long-running British science fiction television series Doctor Who. It features the Eighth Doctor,  Sam, Jo and UNIT.

Synopsis 

Jo Grant, a UNIT veteran, receives a call for help from an old colleague. A scientific unit is being threatened by a UNIT force led by a secretive Captain. Jo Grant ends up sucked out of time and space.

Meanwhile, the Doctor and Sam go to 2109 and find an alien race where the humans should be. To make it worse, the aliens claim to have been there for thousands of years, and something is wrong with Sam's mind.

External links
The Cloister Library - Genocide 

1997 British novels
1997 science fiction novels
Eighth Doctor Adventures
Novels by Paul Leonard
British science fiction novels